Martin Krienzer (born 12 February 2000) is an Austrian professional footballer who plays as a forward for Admira Wacker.

Career
Krienzer is a youth product of FC Stattegg and Sturm Graz, and began his senior career with their reserves in 2016. He made his professional debut with the senior Sturm Graz team in a 4–1 Austrian Football Bundesliga loss to Hartberg on 7 May 2020. On 22 June 2020, he extended his contract with the club until the summer of 2022. He spent the 2020-21 season on loan with Lafnitz in the Austrian 2. Liga.

On 15 June 2022, Krienzer signed a two-year contract with recently relegated 2. Liga club Admira Wacker.

International career
Krienzer is a youth international for Austria, having represented them from the U15s to the U19s.

References

External links
 
 OEFB Profile

2000 births
Living people
Austrian footballers
Austria youth international footballers
SK Sturm Graz players
SV Lafnitz players
FC Admira Wacker Mödling players
Austrian Football Bundesliga players
2. Liga (Austria) players
Austrian Regionalliga players
Association football forwards